"Cuba" is a 1978 song by French musical group Gibson Brothers, released as the first single from their fourth album of the same name (1979). It was the group's first charting single: In the US, "Cuba", went to #81 on the US Billboard Hot 100, and #9 on the Billboard Dance chart. Outside the US, upon its original release, it reached number one in Finland, and was a top 30 hit in Belgium, the Netherlands and West Germany. It also peaked at number 41 in the UK, however, following the success of their follow-up top 10 hit songs "Ooh, What a Life" and "Que Sera Mi Vida (If You Should Go)", it was re-released in 1980 as a double A side single with album track "Better Do It Salsa", reaching number 12 in the UK. However, its chart performance did not improve in the US due in large part to the anti Disco Backlash in the States at the time.

Track listing
 7" single (UK)
A. "Cuba" - 3:02
B. "Cuba" (Club Version)

 7" single (US)
A. "Cuba" - 4:20
B. "Cuba" (Instrumental) - 4:20

 7" single (1980 UK Re-release)
A. "Cuba" - 3:00
A. "Better Do it Salsa 1980" - 3:36

 12" single
A. "Cuba" - 7:50
B. "Cuba" (Instrumental) - 7:50

 88 remix single
A. "Cuba" ('88 Remix) - 8:11
B. "Cuba" (Original Version) - 6:27

 12" single (1980 UK Re-release)
A. "Cuba" (Long Version) - 7:45
A. "Better Do it Salsa" - 6:43

Charts

(*Only after re-release in 1980)

Popular culture

The song is featured in the background in a scene in the 1979 film North Dallas Forty and in the 2001 film Sexy Beast.
The song had an unexpected resurgence in 2020 after Liverpool fans adopted it for new signing Thiago Alcântara.

References

External links 
 Gibson Brothers - Cuba on Discogs
 Music Video on YouTube

1978 songs
1978 singles
1980 songs
1980 singles
Disco songs
Gibson Brothers songs
Number-one singles in Finland
Songs about Cuba